Namkung Do (남궁도, born June 4, 1982) is a South Korean retired football player.

He was part of the South Korean 2004 Olympic football team, who finished second in Group A, making it through to the next round, before being defeated by silver medal winners Paraguay.

His brother Namkung Woong is also a footballer.

Club career 
He played domestically for Jeonbuk Hyundai Motors, Chunnam Dragons, Gwangju Sangmu Bulsajo (while on army service), Pohang Steelers, Seongnam Ilhwa Chunma and Daejeon Citizen, as well as for Belgian club Royal Antwerp.

Club career statistics

Honors

Club
Jeonbuk Hyundai Motors
FA Cup: 2003

Pohang Steelers
K-League Cup: 2009
FA Cup: 2009
AFC Champions League: 2009

Seongnam Ilhwa Chunma
2010 AFC Champions League Winner
2011 FA Cup Winner

References

External links

 National Team Player Record 
 FIFA Player Statistics
 

1982 births
Living people
Association football forwards
South Korean footballers
South Korean expatriate footballers
South Korea international footballers
Jeonbuk Hyundai Motors players
Royal Antwerp F.C. players
Jeonnam Dragons players
Gimcheon Sangmu FC players
Pohang Steelers players
Daejeon Hana Citizen FC players
FC Anyang players
K League 1 players
K League 2 players
Belgian Pro League players
Expatriate footballers in Belgium
Footballers at the 2004 Summer Olympics
Olympic footballers of South Korea
Footballers from Seoul
South Korean expatriate sportspeople in Belgium
Hamyeol Namgung clan